Abrahamina Arnolda Louise Hubrecht, (1855-1913) was a Dutch  painter, etcher, and illustrator.

Biography
Hubrecht was born 21 July 1855 in Rotterdam. She attended Royal Academy of Art at The Hague and the State Academy of Fine Arts in Amsterdam. She married twice, in 1888 to Franciscus Donders (1818-1889), and in 1892 to Alphons Marie Antoine Joseph Grandmont (1837-1909). Her sister,  (1865-1950) was also a painter.

Hubrecht was a member of the Arti et Amicitiae and the Pulchri Studio. She exhibited her work at the Palace of Fine Arts at the 1893 World's Columbian Exposition in Chicago, Illinois.

Hubrecht died 5 November 1913 in Holmbury St Mary, Britain. Her work is in the Rijksmuseum.

Gallery

References

External links
 

1855 births
1913 deaths
Dutch women painters
19th-century Dutch women artists
19th-century Dutch painters
20th-century Dutch women artists
20th-century Dutch painters
Painters from Rotterdam